DeJuan Collins (born November 20, 1976) is an American former professional basketball player. Collins was best known as a scorer, and also for organizing and leading his team's game on offense.

College career
Collins, or "DC" as fans and friends simply call him, began his career at Louisiana State University (LSU) (NCAA Division I) and later played at the Tuskegee Institute (NCAA Division II).

Professional career
A second-division club, WiredMinds Tübingen, part of the German Bundesliga, was Collins' first professional adventure. Led by his team-high 26 points per game, Tübingen was able to win promotion in the 2000–01 season. The biggest surprise of the entire season was their first-round German Cup upset of Alba Berlin. Even though Collins had to play against better teams in the first division, the following season he was able to continue his great performances. He was the top scorer with 23.6 points per game in his first year in the first Bundesliga and he was invited to the All-Star game, subsequently switching to Alba where, in 2002–03, he won the German Championship and the German Cup.

In the 2004–05 season, he played for Aris Salonica and in 2005–06 for Varese Whirlpool. Since halfway through 2006–07, he played for Žalgiris Kaunas, winning the Lithuanian Basketball League (LKL) in 2007 and 2008.

After the season ended he chose a better contract offered by Lokomotiv Rostov for the 2008–09 season. He was released in November 2008. His last club was in Russia, playing for Krasnye Krylia. With Krylia, Collins won the FIBA EuroChallenge.

Career statistics

EuroLeague

|-
| style="text-align:left;"| 2002–03
| style="text-align:left;"| Alba Berlin
| 8 || 8 || 27.0 || .481 || .310 || .667 || 3.6 || 2.6 || 1.5 || .5 || 16.1 || 12.4
|-
| style="text-align:left;"| 2003–04
| style="text-align:left;"| Alba Berlin
| 14 || 14 || 33.3 || .533 || .298 || .778 || 4.2 || 2.5 || 1.3 || .2 || 16.6 || 16.0
|-
| style="text-align:left;"| 2006–07
| style="text-align:left;"| Zalgiris
| 2 || 2 || 36.2 || .500 || .000 || .714 || 3.5 || 4.0 || 1.5 || .0 || 8.5 || 10.0
|-
| style="text-align:left;"| 2007–08
| style="text-align:left;"| Zalgiris
| 20 || 20 || 30.0 || .470 || .211 || .830 || 3.9 || style="background:#CFECEC;"|5.3 || 1.3 || .0 || 10.8 || 14.8
|-
| style="text-align:left;"| 2010–11
| style="text-align:left;"| Zalgiris
| 16 || 8 || 20.3 || .467 || .333 || .837 || 2.1 || 2.3 || 1.3 || .1 || 6.7 || 8.4
|-
| style="text-align:left;"| 2011–12
| style="text-align:left;"| Zalgiris
| 12 || 1 || 15.1 || .481 || .370 || .952 || 1.3 || 1.5 || .1 || .0 || 6.3 || 5.7

References

External links
Player profile @ euroleague.net

1976 births
Living people
African-American basketball players
Alba Berlin players
American expatriate basketball people in Germany
American expatriate basketball people in Greece
American expatriate basketball people in Italy
American expatriate basketball people in Lithuania
American expatriate basketball people in Russia
American expatriate basketball people in Spain
Aris B.C. players
Basketball players from Ohio
BC Krasnye Krylia players
BC Žalgiris players
Brose Bamberg players
Real Betis Baloncesto players
Kavala B.C. players
Liga ACB players
LSU Tigers basketball players
Pallacanestro Varese players
PBC Lokomotiv-Kuban players
Shooting guards
Tuskegee Golden Tigers men's basketball players
Tigers Tübingen players
American men's basketball players
Al Riyadi Club Beirut basketball players
21st-century African-American sportspeople
20th-century African-American sportspeople